The 1866 Delaware gubernatorial election was held on November 6, 1866. On March 1, 1865, Republican Governor William Cannon died in office, elevating State Senate Speaker Gove Saulsbury, a Democrat, to the governorship. Saulsbury ran for re-election in 1866, the first Governor to do so since Joshua Clayton in 1792. He faced Republican nominee James Riddle, a prominent industrialist. Saulsbury defeated Riddle by a decisive margin, ushering in a large Democratic majority in both houses of the legislature.

General election

Results

References

Bibliography
 
 
 
 Delaware House Journal, 71st General Assembly, 1st Reg. Sess. (1867).

1866
Delaware
Gubernatorial